St. Martin's Catholic Church and Grotto is a historic church complex located at 612 Main St in Oelrichs, South Dakota. It features Late 19th and Early 20th Century American Movement architecture and was added to the National Register of Historic Places in 2005.

The church, built in 1885, is a single story church on a stone foundation. The rectory, built in 1925, is one and one-half stories. The grotto was built by Father Gerhard Stakemeir and Nick Bogner, a parishioner, in 1932–1934.

References

Churches in the Roman Catholic Diocese of Rapid City
Former Roman Catholic church buildings in South Dakota
Churches on the National Register of Historic Places in South Dakota
Late 19th and Early 20th Century American Movements architecture
Buildings and structures in Fall River County, South Dakota
National Register of Historic Places in Fall River County, South Dakota
Roman Catholic churches completed in 1885
1885 establishments in Dakota Territory
Grottoes
19th-century Roman Catholic church buildings in the United States